Klara Lovisa Hammarström (born 20 April 2000, in Stockholm) is a Swedish singer and television personality. She has appeared along with her family in the SVT series Familjen Hammarström. She was previously a competitive horse rider.

Career
Hammarström has participated in Melodifestivalen on three occasions. She competed in Melodifestivalen 2020 with the song "Nobody", which failed to qualify from the semi finals. In May 2020, she collaborated on the title The One with Mohombi. She participated in Melodifestivalen 2021 with her song 'Beat of Broken Hearts'. Having qualified to the Andra Chansen round, she defeated Efraim Leo's song and qualified for the grand final of the competition, where she ended up at the sixth place out of twelve finalists with a total score of 74 points. She returned to Melodifestivalen in 2022 with the song "Run to the Hills". She directly qualified for the final from the fourth heat and placed sixth in the final.

Discography

Singles

References

External links

Living people
2000 births
Singers from Stockholm
Swedish women singers
Melodifestivalen contestants of 2022
Melodifestivalen contestants of 2021
Melodifestivalen contestants of 2020